

Highest-grossing films

List of films
A list of films released in Japan in 2007 (see 2007 in film).

External links
 Japanese films of 2007 at the Internet Movie Database
 2007 in Japan
 2007 in Japanese television
 List of 2007 box office number-one films in Japan

2007
Japanese
Films